Trieces is a genus of parasitoid wasps belonging to the family Ichneumonidae.

The species of this genus are found in Europe, Africa and Northern America.

Species:
 Trieces agilis Tolkanitz, 1986
 Trieces aquilus Townes & Townes, 1959

References

Ichneumonidae
Ichneumonidae genera